Xiamen (515) was a Type 053 frigate of the People's Liberation Army Navy. 

 Development and design 

The PLAN retired many older frigates in the 1970s, and the No. 701 Institute developed the Type 053H (Hai for anti-ship) as a replacement. The initial design was armed with four SY-1 anti-ship missiles in two twin-missile box launchers, two single 100 mm. guns, six twin 37mm guns, depth charges and short-range ASW rockets. The Type 053H received the NATO codename Jianghu-I. The first was constructed by the Hudong Shipyard and entered service in the mid-1970s. At least a dozen were built and entered service with the PLAN East Sea Fleet. 

The Type 053H was improved in four successive subclasses, receiving NATO codenames Jianghu-II through Jianghu-V. The Type 053Hs were succeeded by the PLAN's first multirole frigates, the Type 053H2G and Type 053H3 frigates.

Construction and career 
She was launched on 27 October 1975 at Hudong-Zhonghua Shipyard in Shanghai and commissioned on 31 December 1975.

She was decommissioned in August 2013 and currently she lies at Taizhou Naval Museum, Taizhou as a museum ship near the Taizhou Yangtze River Bridge.

References

1975 ships
Type 053 frigates
Ships built in China
Museum ships in China